Presentation Secondary School, Clonmel is a secondary school established by the Presentation Sisters for the education of girls in Clonmel, County Tipperary in Ireland.

History
The foundation of the schools at their present site to the west of the town was laid in 1865 and the buildings completed the following year. These have since been replaced by modern structures. The site includes the accommodation building of a former boarding school built in 1937, "with the main object of fostering vocations".

In 2007, the school began operating under the trusteeship of CEIST Catholic Education an Irish Schools Trust.

Notable graduates
 Serena Corr

References

External links
Official school website - Presentation Secondary School

Education in County Tipperary
Secondary schools in County Tipperary